Amontes is a monotypic moth genus in the family Depressariidae. Its sole species is Amontes princeps, which was described by Viette in 1958. It is found in Madagascar.

References

Stenomatinae
Monotypic moth genera
Moths of Madagascar